Henryk Mieczysław Milcarz (born 21 July 1950 in Zagnańsk) is a Polish politician. He was elected to the Sejm on 25 September 2005, getting 5,251 votes in 33 Kielce district as a candidate from Democratic Left Alliance list.

See also
Members of Polish Sejm 2005-2007

External links
Henryk Milcarz - parliamentary page - includes declarations of interest, voting record, and transcripts of speeches.

1950 births
Living people
Democratic Left Alliance politicians
Members of the Polish Sejm 2005–2007
Members of the Polish Sejm 2007–2011